E75 or E-75 may refer to:

Arts and Entertainment
 King's Indian Defense, Encyclopaedia of Chess Openings code

Military
 E-75 Standardpanzer, a German World War II tank version in the Entwicklung series

Science and Technology
 Nokia E75, a mobile phone
 WHO classification of a Lysosomal storage disease
 E75, one of the Common ethanol fuel mixtures
 The peptide component of the NeuVax cancer vaccine

Transportation
 European route E75, a road
 Higashihiroshima-Kure Expressway, route E75 in Japan
 The E175, a member of the Embraer E-Jet family